Jin-ichi (Jin No. 1 )Dam is a gravity dam located in Toyama prefecture in Japan. The dam is used for power production. The catchment area of the dam is 1960 km2. The dam impounds about 78  ha of land when full and can store 5742 thousand cubic meters of water. The construction of the dam was started on 1951 and completed in 1954.

References

Dams in Toyama Prefecture
1954 establishments in Japan